The Diachronic Museum of Larisa exhibits findings from the regional districts of Larissa, Trikala and Karditsa.

Location 
The museum is located on the southeastern outskirts of Larissa on Mezourios Hill.

The Building 

In 1984 an architectural competition for the construction of the museum was announced, which was won by the architect P. Fotiadis. The construction works began in 1996 and were completed in 2006. The old archaeological museum, which was housed in a mosque in the city center, closed in 2012. After the exhibits were moved, the museum opened to the public on November 28, 2015. The complex consists of three buildings, ranging from two to four floors.

 The first building houses the reception, a 100-seat amphitheater, rooms for events, a gift store and a café.
 The second building houses the offices of the Ephorate of Prehistoric and Classical Antiquities of Larissa.
 The museum itself occupies the main part of the whole complex. Attached to the exhibition area, besides storage rooms, are workshops for the treatment and conservation of paintings and murals, stone and marble, ceramics and glass, metals and mosaics..

Arrangement of the finds 

 Prehistoric era
 Neolithic Era
 Bronze Age
 Archaic and Classical Period
 Hellenistic and Roman Period
 Early Christian Period
 Byzantine period
 Era of the Ottoman domination

Important finds 

 Animal bones and tools from prehistoric times.
 Well-preserved ceramic and glass finds
 Coins, including two golden Persian dareikoi
 An urn from the Archaic period inscribed with letters from a Thessalian alphabet
 Metal larnax guarded by a dog
 Mosaics from the early Christian and Byzantine periods
 Icons and epitaphs

Literature 
 The Return of the Muses, catalog of parts of the exhibition. Publisher: Ministry of Culture and Sport, Larissa Ephorate of Antiquities, Metropolis of Larisa and Tirnavos, Metropolis of Elassona, ISBN 978-960-386-506-3

References

External links
 Diachronic Museum Larisa (Ministry of culture and sport)
 Diachronic Museum Larisa (Website of the Museums)

Buildings and structures in Larissa
Archaeological museums in Thessaly
2015 establishments in Greece